The 2021 African Taekwondo Championships was held in Dakar, Senegal on 5 and 6 June 2021.

Results

Men

Women

Medal table

References

African Taekwondo Championships
2021 in Senegalese sport
2021 in taekwondo
Taekwondo Championships
Taekwondo in Senegal
Taekwondo Championships